Thabane is a South African name that may refer to:

Lipolelo Thabane (1959–2017), Mosotho political figure
Maesiah Thabane (born 1977), wife of Tom
Thabane Rankara (born 1978), Mosotho football player
Thabane Sutu, Lesotho football coach and player
Tom Thabane (born 1939), Mosotho politician and Prime Minister of Lesotho 

Sotho-language surnames